Lavakusha (stylized as LavaKusha) is a 2017 Indian Malayalam-language comedy thriller film directed by Gireesh Mano and starring Neeraj Madhav, Aju Varghese, Biju Menon, Deepti Sati, Aditi Ravi and Vijay Babu. The songs were composed by Gopi Sundar. The film was released in India on 19 October 2017 coinciding with Diwali.

Summary
The story revolves around two happy-go-lucky friends, Lavan and Kushan. Things take a turn when they are approached by a mysterious guy and girl, who influence their lives in various ways.

Cast

Biju Menon as DSP Joy Kappan, CBCID
Neeraj Madhav as Lava
Aju Varghese as Kusha
Deepti Sati as ASP Jennifer George, CBCID / Sheetal
Aditi Ravi as Minnah
Vijay Babu as Cyril Abraham / Banglan
Ashwin Kumar as David Luke
Major Ravi as Crime Branch S.P Nandakumar
Nirmal Palazhi as Sumesh
Anjali Nair as Vanaja Sumesh
Thesni Khan as Sarita
Vishnu Govindan as Freddy. David's henchman
Gokulan as Shambu
Akshara Kishore as Angel
Janardhanan as Sathyan, film producer
Sinoj Varghese as Muthu
Neena Kurup as Nancy
Raja Sahib as Nancy's husband
Nandini Sree as Shalini
Kalabhavan Haneefa as T.T.R
Madan Mohan as DySP Ajay Gosh, CBCID

Production
Lavakusha is the screenwriter debut of actor Neeraj Madhav, who also starred in the lead role alongside Aju Varghese.

Soundtrack
The film's soundtrack was composed by Gopi Sundar and contains two songs. The soundtrack album was released by RJ Creations label on 29 September 2017.
"Ayyapante Amma" (Neeraj Madhav, Aju Varghese) - 3:18
"LavaKusha Theme" Rzee - 3:28
"Ente Kayyil Onnumilla" (Atul P. M.) - 4:12

Release
The film opened in theaters in India on 12 October 2017.

References

External links
 

2017 films
2010s Malayalam-language films
2010s comedy thriller films
Indian comedy thriller films
2017 comedy films